Mohamed Musa is a Sudanese footballer who plays for Al-Nsoor in the Sudan Premier League. He is a member of the Sudan National Football Team.

References

Sudanese footballers
Living people
2012 Africa Cup of Nations players
1990 births
Association football midfielders
Sudan international footballers